The Pot'onggang Organic Compound Fertiliser Factory(), located in Chŏngpy'ŏng-dong, P'yŏngch'ŏn-guyŏk, P'yŏngyang, North Korea, was opened in 2012 to produce organic fertiliser making use of sediments and fly ash from an adjacent sewage treatment plant and sludge from the Pot'ong River. It is served by rail via the P'yŏngnam Line of the Korean State Railway.

References

Fertilizer companies of North Korea